Tony Gill Lespoir (born September 1, 1976) is a Seychellois sprint canoer who has competed since the mid-2000s. At the 2004 Summer Olympics in Athens, he was eliminated in the semifinals of the K-1 500 m event and the heats of the K-1 1000 m event. Four years later in Beijing, Lespoir was eliminated in the heats in both the K-1 500 m and the K-1 1000 m events.

References
Sports-Reference.com profile

1976 births
Canoeists at the 2004 Summer Olympics
Canoeists at the 2008 Summer Olympics
Living people
Olympic canoeists of Seychelles
Seychellois male canoeists
Competitors at the 2019 African Games
African Games competitors for Seychelles